The 1951 LFF Lyga was the 30th season of the LFF Lyga football competition in Lithuania.  It was contested by 12 teams, and Inkaras Kaunas won the championship.

League standings

References
RSSSF

LFF Lyga seasons
1951 in Lithuanian sport
LFF